SC Karl-Marx-Stadt was a sports club located at Karl-Marx-Stadt in the German Democratic Republic.

Established in 1945, the sports club went through a variation of name changes until 1 July 1963, settling with SC Karl-Marx-Stadt, which lasted until its dissolution around the end of 1990.

Sports

Figure skating
SC Karl-Marx-Stadt's figure skaters had won medals in Olympic, World, European, international and national competitions.

The coach for the club's singles' ladies and men's figure skating from 1960 through 1990 (the East German club's disestablishment) was Jutta Müller, who also coached her own daughter, Gabriele Seyfert. Seyfert, the first person Müller coached, won ten consecutive East German national championships from 1961 to 1970, three European Championships, two World Championships, as well as placing second in the 1968 Olympic Winter Games, becoming East Germany's first person to win an Olympic medal. Ladies figure skaters that Müller coached included Seyfert, Martina Clausner, Sonja Morgenstern, Simone Gräfe, Steffi Knoll, Anett Pötzsch, Marion Weber, Katarina Witt,  Constanze Gensel, Evelyn Großmann, Simone Lang and Claudia Wagler. Men's figure skaters she coached included Günter Zöller, Klaus Purrücker, Jan Hoffmann, Nils Köpp, Rico Krahnert and Ronny Winkler. Jan Hoffmann was the most successful male figure skater from East Germany, having won four European Championship titles, two World Championship titles and a silver medal at the 1980 Olympic Winter Games. Anett Pötzsch won four European Championship titles, two World Championships and a gold medal at the 1980 Olympic Winter Games, the first Olympic gold medal in figure skating for the GDR. Pötzsch ended her career in 1980. Katarina Witt was the most successful East German with six Championship titles, four World Championship titles and two Olympic victories.

In addition to Jutta Müller, Irene Salzmann coached pairs figure skaters Sabine Baeß and Tassilo Thierbach for SC Karl-Marx-Stadt.

In late 1990, SC Karl-Marx-Stadt was succeeded by Eissportverein Chemnits (EVC), which itself was succeeded by Chemnitzer Eislauf-Club e.V. (CEC), in late 1998.

SC Karl-Marx-Stadt medalists
Olympic Figure Skating Championships

World Figure Skating Championships

European Figure Skating Championships

East German Figure Skating Championships

Eissportverein Chemnits (EVC) medalists
Olympic Figure Skating Championships

World Figure Skating Championships

European Figure Skating Championships

German Figure Skating Championships

Chemnitzer Eislauf-Club e.V. (CEC) medalists
Olympic Figure Skating Championships

World Figure Skating Championships

European Figure Skating Championships

German Figure Skating Championships

Speed skating
In contrast to figure skating, speed skating produced only one athlete of world class. Gabi Pliers won three Olympic bronze medals, 12 World Championship medals, and four European title. Speed skating and figure skating went on to form a new successor club upon German reunification.

Football
The footballers of the SC Karl-Marx-Stadt originally began play in 1954. The football department was separated from the sports club and reorganized as football club FC Karl-Marx-Stadt in 1966. The football club was renamed Chemnitzer FC after the Peaceful Revolution.

Weight lifting
The Weightlifters were numerically the most successful department of SC Karl-Marx-Stadt, with 125 medals coming from the Olympics, World and European Championships.

Athletics
Track and field athletes of the SC Karl-Marx-Stadt were quite successful, winning two Olympic gold medals, two World Championships and seven European Championship titles.

Cycling
The track cyclists of the SC Karl-Marx-Stadt won two silver medals at the Olympic Games.

Swimming
Swimming produced 119 medals, of which 72 were Olympic gold medals, World and European Championships and was the most successful section of the sporting club with titles.

Gymnastics
The KTV Chemnitz emerged from the section of gymnastics as its successor sports club.

Medals
Medals of athletes of the SC Karl-Marx-Stadt from 1963 to 1989.

References

External links
 Chemnitzer Eislauf-Club e.V. (CEC)

History of sport in East Germany
Sports clubs in East Germany
1945 establishments in Germany
1990 disestablishments in Germany